Adjustments of theodolite may refer to:
 Permanent adjustments of theodolite
 Temporary adjustments of theodolite

See also
 Adjustment computations